Pinky Ka Dulha (English: Groom of Pinky) is a 2019 Pakistani comedy television film which aired on Hum TV during August 2019. The film was written By Musawir Khan, developed by Shahzad Javed, Head of Content, HUM TV and produced by MD Productions and Angelic Films. It features Ushna Shah, Muneeb Butt, Hassan Ahmed, Gul-e-Rana, Khalid Anam, Sajid Hassan and Saman Ansari in pivotal roles.

Cast 
Ushna Shah as Pinky
Muneeb Butt as Bilal
Hassan Ahmed as Wasif
Parveen Akbar as Pinky's mother
Gul-e-Rana
Khalid Anam
Sajid Hassan *Saman Ansari

References 

2019 comedy films
2019 films
Pakistani television films